Mesothen restricta is a moth of the subfamily Arctiinae. It was described by Rothschild in 1931. It is found in Venezuela.

References

 Natural History Museum Lepidoptera generic names catalog

Mesothen (moth)
Moths described in 1931